Halbert Harvill (November 28, 1893 – December 1, 1986) was an American university president, basketball and baseball coach, and politician. A native of Tennessee, Harvill became an educator and taught in small towns until he served in the Army during World War I. Upon his return from war, he attended Middle Tennessee State University where he graduated in 1927. Harvill moved to Murfreesboro, Tennessee to become an assistant professor of history at Austin Peay State University. After a few years, he fought in World War II, and upon his return Harvill was named the next president of Austin Peay. Harvill held the position from 1946 to 1962. During his tenure, the school grew from 417 full-time students to 2,118 and had constructed 13 new buildings. Harvill also served as the school's first ever men's basketball head coach and just their second ever baseball head coach. He coached the basketball team in 1929–30 and again from 1933 to 1936, and he coached baseball from 1933 through 1936. His overall records were 29–18 (basketball) and 27–23 (baseball).

Two years after retiring in 1962 as being Austin Peay State University's president, Harvill was convinced by a friend to run for the Tennessee Senate. At 70 years old he was elected and served for 16 years in the General Assembly's upper chambers before retiring for good. Harvill died at Memorial Hospital in Clarksville, Tennessee on December 1, 1986.

Head coaching records

Basketball

Baseball

References

1893 births
1986 deaths
Baseball coaches from Tennessee
Basketball coaches from Tennessee
Austin Peay Governors baseball coaches
Austin Peay Governors men's basketball coaches
Austin Peay State University faculty
Tennessee state senators
Middle Tennessee State University alumni
People from Clarksville, Tennessee
Presidents of Austin Peay State University
20th-century American politicians
Sportspeople from Tennessee
20th-century American academics